El Cartel II: Los Cangris or El Cartel De Yankee II is a compilation album by Daddy Yankee presenting many artists. The only album released by Pina Records and El Cartel Productions.

Track listing

 DVD Infomercial On Cartel 2
Radio Version Cartel 2 ("Tu Cuerpo En La Cama/ Se Unen O Se Mueren/ Nigga What What") - Daddy Yankee, Nicky Jam, Karel & Voltio, and MC Ceja

Daddy Yankee compilation albums
2001 compilation albums
Pina Records compilation albums